Timothy P. Lang Sr. is a New Hampshire politician currently serving in the New Hampshire Senate.

House Committee assignments:

2017-18 Clerk - Ways and Means

2017-18 Member - Joint Legislative Committee on Administrative Rules (JLCAR)

2019-20 Member Ways and Means

2019-20 Member Election Law

2019-20 Member Joint Legislative Committee on Administrative Rules (JLCAR)

2021-22 Chairman Fish and Game, and Marine Resources

2021-22 Member Ways and Means

2021-22 Member Joint Legislative Committee on Administrative Rules (JLCAR)

Task Forces

2020-21 Member Governor'sEconomic Re-Opening Task Force

Lang has been serving in the New Hampshire House of Representatives since 2016. He attended Humboldt State University from 1985 to 1987, and has a in a Bachelor of Science in Information Technology from Western Governors University.

References

Living people
Republican Party members of the New Hampshire House of Representatives
21st-century American politicians
Year of birth missing (living people)